Mercy is a 2012 German drama film directed by Matthias Glasner. The film was shown in competition at the 62nd Berlin International Film Festival in February 2012. The film is about a German couple and their teenage son who emigrate to the north of Norway.

Cast
 Jürgen Vogel as Niels
 Birgit Minichmayr as Maria
 Henry Stange as Markus
 Ane Dahl Torp as Linda
 Maria Bock as Wenche
 Stig Henrik Hoff as Björn
 Iren Reppen as Sofie
 Richard André Knutsen as Mikkel
 Kristoffer Mortensen as Ole
 Katharina Strauch as Stine
 Bjørn Sundquist as Mads
 David Hjelle Pettersen as Petter

References

External links
 
 

2012 films
2012 drama films
German drama films
2010s German-language films
English-language German films
2010s German films